The Kajiwa Dam is a concrete-face rock-fill dam on the Muli River near Kajiwa in Muli Tibetan Autonomous County, Sichuan Province, China. 

Preliminary construction (roads, bridges, foundation work) on the dam began in 2008 and construction on the 452.4 MW power station began in August 2011. The dam began to impound its reservoir in December 2014. The first 110 MW unit was commissioned on 16 March 2015. The power station went fully operational in the end of 2015.

See also

List of tallest dams in the world
List of dams and reservoirs in China
List of tallest dams in China

References

Dams in China
Concrete-face rock-fill dams
Hydroelectric power stations in Sichuan
Liangshan Yi Autonomous Prefecture
Dams completed in 2014
2014 establishments in China